Fenestrulina rugula is a bryozoan species from the genus Fenestrulina. The scientific name of the species was first published in 1990 by Hayward & Ryland.

References

Animals described in 1990
Cheilostomatida